De Cuba was the first privately owned, independent magazine in Cuba since the end of Fulgencio Batista dictatorship. It was published on a bimonthly basis.

Only three issues of the magazine were published: December 2002, February 2003 and September 2003.

Journalists
 Ricardo González Alfonso

References

External links
 De Cuba December 2002 issue (Spanish)
 De Cuba February 2003 issue (Spanish)

2002 establishments in Cuba
2003 disestablishments in Cuba
Bi-monthly magazines
Political repression in Cuba
Defunct magazines published in Cuba
Magazines established in 2002
Magazines disestablished in 2003
Spanish-language magazines